GATM may refer to:
GATM (gene)
Global air-traffic management
Humanitarian Association of World Turkmens